Beury is an unincorporated community and coal town  in Fayette County, West Virginia, United States.

The community has the name of J. L. Beury, the proprietor of a mine.

References 

Unincorporated communities in West Virginia
Unincorporated communities in Fayette County, West Virginia
Coal towns in West Virginia